The Illinois Governor's Mansion (formerly, Illinois Executive Mansion) is the official residence of the governor of Illinois. It is located in the state capital, Springfield, Illinois. The Italianate-style Mansion was designed by Chicago architect John M. Van Osdel with a modified 'H' shaped configuration with a long central section, and the front and back on the sides of the 'H'. The 16-room manor was completed in 1855 and was first occupied by governor Joel Matteson, who held the official grand opening on January 10, 1856. It is one of the oldest historic residences in the state of Illinois and one of the three oldest continuously occupied governor's mansions in the United States.  In 1898 alterations to the exterior added neoclassical elements. In 1972, the Illinois Governor's Mansion Association was founded as a charitable corporation to assist in the maintenance and programming at the mansion. The Mansion was added to the National Register of Historic Places in 1976.

During the Christmas season the mansion is decorated lavishly with Christmas decorations, including over a dozen Christmas trees. Although sometimes used for state functions such as state dinners and meetings, the mansion also functions as a house museum. The libraries, bedrooms, parlors, sitting rooms, etc. are maintained as they may have looked in the 19th century. The governor and his family are not required to reside in the mansion. Rather, a 7-room private apartment on the second floor of the mansion is provided for the governor and his family.

Governor George Ryan and First Lady Lura Lynn Ryan refurbished much of the mansion's furniture during their 1999 - 2003 tenure using private donations.  In 2011, a multimillion-dollar renovation was planned because the last repairs to the mansion were in 1971.

The 2014 polar vortex led to significant water damage to the mansion, and Governor Pat Quinn, who chose to live in the mansion part-time, allocated about $40,000 in emergency repairs. Shortly after his election as governor, Bruce Rauner announced that he and his wife would invest some of their money into repairing the mansion so they could live in it during his term. On July 18, 2016, Illinois First Lady Diana Rauner announced a $15 million renovation project for the mansion, with the funding being raised privately. The work was completed for the Illinois bicentennial in 2018.

Governor Rauner signed an executive order renaming the Executive Mansion, the Illinois Governor's Mansion, which became effective July 1, 2018.  The renovated mansion includes a new visitor's center, and made the mansion compliant with the Americans with Disabilities Act.

Current Governor J.B. Pritzker currently resides in the governor's mansion full-time while his family commutes between Chicago and Springfield. Again using private funds, additional renovations to guest rooms, fixtures, and plumbing were done in fall 2019.

References

External links

Official website
Illinois Governor's Mansion Association

Governors' mansions in the United States
Houses completed in 1855
Historic house museums in Illinois
Museums in Springfield, Illinois
National Register of Historic Places in Springfield, Illinois
Government buildings in Illinois
Houses on the National Register of Historic Places in Illinois
Houses in Springfield, Illinois
Mansion